Mimacalolepta dunni is a species of beetle in the family Cerambycidae, and the only species in the genus Mimacalolepta. It was described by Breuning in 1976.

References

Desmiphorini
Beetles described in 1976
Monotypic beetle genera